Dan Upperco (born May 23, 1963) is a corporate executive, entrepreneur, and former American football tight end for the Los Angeles Raiders of the National Football League. He signed as a free agent in 1985 after achieving All-Ivy League  honors 3 years running at Columbia University.

High school career
Three sports letterman at William R. Boone High School in Orlando, Florida playing football, basketball and competed in track and field. In basketball was first-team All-Metro Conference and in football played tight end and defensive end making the All-State team playing in the 1981 Sunshine State Game, was chosen first-team to the All-Metro Conference and All-Central Florida squads, MVP of his high school football team and school Hall of Fame.

College career
 Finished his college career at Columbia University with 16 touchdowns, 107 receptions, 1,587 receiving yards averaging over 35 catches and over 500 yards during each of his three varsity years.
 Setting a number of Columbia records and at one time held the Ivy League record of catches in a single game, 13.
 Made the All-Ivy League teams every year during his varsity career (1st team his junior & senior year, Honorable Mention sophomore year).
 Sporting News Preseason All-American
 Playboy 's Pigskin Preview Issue All-East team
 Chosen team MVP his senior year winning the prestigious “Smythe Cup” with Columbia’s football tradition being the 3rd longest in the nation playing the 2nd collegiate football game in 1870.

Professional sports career

Upperco signed with the Oakland Raiders franchise, which at the time was located in Los Angeles. He played during the pre-season and had a knee injury against the Dallas Cowboys sidelining him for the rest of the 1985 season. He served as a two-term vice president and one term as treasurer for the National Football League Retired Players Association – Tri-State Chapter.

Education
 B.A. in economics - Columbia University (Dean's List, Class Marshall)
 M.B.A. in finance - Rutgers University
 Executive M.B.A. from the Ashridge Management College in Berkhamsted, England.

Business career

Currently, senior vice president at Mubadala Development Company, the strategic investment arm of the government of Abu Dhabi, $48 billion of assets under management and revenue of $7.6 billion for 2011.[7] Roles for Mubadala include chief financial officer of a multimillion-dollar global facilities management, development and infrastructure company and senior vice president roles in the company’s Aerospace ($1.6 billion / $3.5 billion assets) and Real Estate & Hospitality ($450 million revenue / $3 billion assets) Business Units.
Business career includes corporate, Wall Street and entrepreneurial positions at MTB Banking Corporation, AT&T, Alcatel-Lucent, Bell Laboratories, Cares Built, Avaya Business Solutions, Virgin Mobile USA and Financial Recovery Services.

References

1963 births
Living people
Players of American football from Orlando, Florida
American football tight ends
Columbia Lions football players
Los Angeles Raiders players
Rutgers University alumni